Protuliocnemis is a genus of moths in the family Geometridae erected by Jeremy Daniel Holloway in 1996.

Species
Species include:
Protuliocnemis biplagiata (Moore, [1887]) Sri Lanka, southern India, Sundaland, New Caledonia, New Guinea, Australia
Protuliocnemis castalaria (Oberthür, 1916)
Protuliocnemis helpsi Holloway, 1996 Borneo, Singapore
Protuliocnemis partita (Walker, 1861) India - Indochina, Sundaland, New Guinea, Queensland
Protuliocnemis woodfordi (Warren) Vanuatu

References

Geometridae